Turbigo is a comune (municipality) in the Province of Milan in the Italian region Lombardy, located about  west of Milan, along the Naviglio Grande canal.

Turbigo borders the following municipalities: Castano Primo, Cameri, Robecchetto con Induno, Galliate. It is the birthplace of naturalist Giuseppe Gené.

It is home to a medieval castle, known from the 9th century and perhaps built around a Roman tower, and to  church of Santi Cosma e Damiano (1639–40). Also from the 17th century is a bridge over the Naviglio Grande.

On 3 June 1859, Turbigo was the site of the Battle of Turbigo, a battle of the Second Italian War of Independence.  Franco-Piedmontese troops crossed the Ticino via a pontoon bridge to occupy the town. The battle is commemorated in the name of rue de Turbigo, a Paris street.

References

Cities and towns in Lombardy